Juha Jääskä (born 9 February 1998) is a Finnish ice hockey forward currently playing for HIFK of the Finnish Liiga.

References

External links
 

1998 births
Living people
HIFK (ice hockey) players
Finnish ice hockey forwards
Ice hockey people from Helsinki
Rovaniemen Kiekko players